Pinara obliqua is a species of moth.

Description

Range

Habitat

Ecology

Etymology

Taxonomy

References

Lasiocampidae
Moths described in 1855